The 2nd Society of Texas Film Critics Awards were given by the Society of Texas Film Critics (STFC) on December 28, 1995. The list of winners was announced by STFC president, Joe Leydon. Founded in 1994, the Society of Texas Film Critics members included 18 film critics working for print and broadcast outlets across the state of Texas. The Usual Suspects received four awards, more than any other film.

Winners
 Best Film:
 The Usual Suspects 
 Best Director:
 Bryan Singer – The Usual Suspects
 Best Actor:
 Nicolas Cage – Leaving Las Vegas
 Best Actress:
 Emma Thompson – Carrington and Sense and Sensibility
 Best Supporting Actor:
 Kevin Spacey – The Usual Suspects, Se7en, and Outbreak
 Best Supporting Actress:
 Joan Allen – Nixon
 Best Original Screenplay:
 Christopher McQuarrie – The Usual Suspects
 Best Adapted Screenplay:
 Emma Thompson – Sense and Sensibility
 Best Foreign Language Film:
 Il Postino (The Postman) – Italy
 Best Documentary Film:
 Crumb
 Lone Star Award (for a motion picture filmed in part and/or set in Texas):
 Apollo 13

References

1995
1995 film awards